Gizo Jeladze (born 17 May 1975) is a Georgian retired professional football player. He also holds Russian citizenship.

Jeladze played one league match for FC Dinamo Tbilisi's 1995–96 league-winning side, and three league matches for its 1996–97 league-winning side.

His older brother Zviad Jeladze is also a footballer.

References

1975 births
Living people
Sportspeople from Sukhumi
Footballers from Abkhazia
Footballers from Georgia (country)
Expatriate footballers from Georgia (country)
Russian Premier League players
FC Dinamo Tbilisi players
FC Sokol Saratov players
FC Zhemchuzhina Sochi players
FC Baltika Kaliningrad players
FC Rubin Kazan players
FC Dinamo Batumi players
Expatriate footballers in Russia
Expatriate footballers in Kazakhstan
Expatriate sportspeople from Georgia (country) in Russia
Expatriate sportspeople from Georgia (country) in Kazakhstan
Association football midfielders
FC Lokomotiv Saint Petersburg players